Emma Cannon (born June 1, 1989) is an American basketball player for the Indiana Fever of the Women's National Basketball Association (WNBA). She previously played for the Connecticut Sun, Indiana Fever, Las Vegas Aces, and Phoenix Mercury.

Early life 
Cannon attended the School of the Arts in Rochester, New York.  While at the School of the Arts, Cannon collected 1,800 points and also 1,800 rebounds. She also holds the school record for both most points (47) and rebounds (35) in a single game. Following her outstanding high school career, Cannon committed to play collegiate basketball at Central Florida.

College

Central Florida
During Cannon's freshman year, she was named to the C-USA All-Freshman team after averaging 11.7 ppg and 8.7 rpg. She continued her impressive play the following year, being named to the C-USA 1st Team. She broke the school record for rebounds in a season with 393. She was also named the C-USA Tournament MVP leading the Knights to the NCAA Tournament. Her junior year, she joined the 1,000 point club for the Knights and continued to move up both the points and rebound list for both the school and C-USA. Following her outstanding high school career, Cannon committed to play collegiate basketball at Central Florida.

Florida Southern
Cannon transferred to Florida Southern for her senior year and continued her individual and team success. She helped guide the Mocs to a 26–5 record and a trip to the Regional Final - finishing as the Runner-Up. She scored 15.7 ppg and 12.1 rpg. She was named an NCAA Division-II All-American Honorable Mention, as well.

WNBA career

Phoenix Mercury
Cannon went undrafted in the 2011 WNBA Draft and had to wait until 2017 before making her way into the league. In 2017, Cannon signed with the Phoenix Mercury and appeared in 34 games. She finished that season averaging 4.4 points per game and 3.6 rebounds per game. She led all WNBA rookies in field goal percentage, while ranking 7th in scoring and 3rd in rebounding. Cannon signed again with Phoenix in 2018 in hopes once again make the roster, but was cut in training camp.

Connecticut Sun
Cannon signed a training camp contract with the Connecticut Sun in 2019, but once again didn't make the final squad and was cut before the season began.

Las Vegas Aces
Cannon signed with the Las Vegas Aces on September 9 and was eligible to play on the 12th after completing her quarantine period due to the COVID-19 protocols of the WNBA Bubble. She signed again with them in 2021 and made the Opening Day roster for the Aces. She played in 3 games in 2021 before being waived on May 31, 2021.

Connecticut Sun
Cannon signed with Connecticut after being waived by Vegas on June 7, 2021. She signed as a replacement/hardship player after Jonquel Jones left due to an overseas commitment.

Indiana Fever

After being released by the Sun, Cannon signed a seven day contract with the Indiana Fever.

WNBA Career Stats

Regular Season

|-
| style="text-align:left;"| 2017
| style="text-align:left;"| Phoenix
| 34 || 0 || 12.9 || .491 || .000 || .587 || 3.6 || 0.3 || 0.2 || 0.2 || 0.9 || 4.4
|-
| style="text-align:left;"| 2020
| style="text-align:left;"| Las Vegas
| 1 || 0 || 0.0 || .000 || .000 || .000 || 0.0 || 0.0 || 0.0 || 0.0 || 0.0 || 0.0
|-
| style="text-align:left;"| 2021
| style="text-align:left;"| Las Vegas
| 3 || 0 || 5.7 || .400 || .000 || 1.000 || 1.7 || 0.3 || 0.0 || 0.3 || 1.0 || 2.0
|-
| style="text-align:left;"| 2021
| style="text-align:left;"| Connecticut
| 5 || 0 || 11.6 || .471 || .500 || .500 || 3.0 || 0.8 || 0.0 || 0.2 || 1.0 || 4.2
|-
| style="text-align:left;"| 2021
| style="text-align:left;"| Indiana
| 12 || 6 || 18.3 || .443 || .214 || .714 || 4.5 || 1.0 || 0.4 || 0.2 || 2.0 || 6.9
|-
| style="text-align:left;"| 2022
| style="text-align:left;"| Phoenix
| 1 || 0 || 6.0 || 1.000 || .000 || .500 || 2.0 || 1.0 || 0.0 || 0.0 || 0.0 || 3.0
|-
| style="text-align:left;"| 2022
| style="text-align:left;"| Indiana
| 23 || 2 || 14.3 || .522 || .500 || .739 || 3.2 || 0.5 || 0.6 || 0.1 || 0.7 || 7.0
|- 
| style="text-align:left;"| Career
| style="text-align:left;"| 4 years, 4 teams
| 79 || 8 || 13.5 || .489 || .364 || .659 || 3.4 || 0.5 || 0.3 || 0.1 || 1.0 || 5.4
|}

Playoffs

|-
| style="text-align:left;"| 2017
| style="text-align:left;"| Phoenix
| 4 || 0 || 10.0 || .286 || .000 || .000 || 4.3 || 0.3 || 0.0 || 0.0 || 0.5 || 1.0
|-
| style="text-align:left;"| 2020
| style="text-align:left;"| Las Vegas
| 6 || 0 || 14.3 || .500 || .200 || .000 || 2.2 || 0.8 || 0.0 || 0.0 || 1.7 || 3.8
|- class="sortbottom"
| style="text-align:left;"| Career
| style="text-align:left;"| 2 years, 2 teams
| 10 || 0 || 12.6 || .448 || .200 || .000 || 3.0 || 0.6 || 0.0 || 0.10|| 1.2 || 3.8
|}

References

1989 births
Living people
American women's basketball players
Basketball players from New York (state)
College women's basketball players in the United States
Connecticut Sun players
Florida Southern College alumni
Indiana Fever players
Las Vegas Aces players
LGBT basketball players
LGBT people from New York (state)
Lesbian sportswomen
Phoenix Mercury players
Power forwards (basketball)
Sportspeople from Rochester, New York
University of Central Florida alumni
Undrafted Women's National Basketball Association players